Qarah Su Rural District is in Meshgin-e Sharqi  District of Meshgin Shahr County, Ardabil province, Iran. At the census of 2006, its population was 5,454 in 1,466 households; there were 3,956 inhabitants in 1,257 households at the following census of 2011; and in the most recent census of 2016, the population of the rural district was 3,237 in 1,192 households. The largest of its 10 villages was Dadeh Beyglu, with 662 people.

References 

Meshgin Shahr County

Rural Districts of Ardabil Province

Populated places in Ardabil Province

Populated places in Meshgin Shahr County